Dwight Dinkla (born December 30, 1951) is a former member of the Iowa House of Representatives from 1993 to 1999. Dinkla was raised in Adair County, Iowa.  He attended Morningside College and received a Juris Doctor degree from Drake University.

Sources
Iowa Legislature bio of Dinkla 

1951 births
Living people
Members of the Iowa House of Representatives
Morningside University alumni
20th-century American politicians
People from Adair County, Iowa
Drake University Law School alumni